Kazuhiro "Kazu" Kibuishi (born April 8, 1978) is a Japanese-born American graphic novel author and illustrator. He is best known for being the creator and editor of the comic anthology Flight and for creating the webcomic Copper. He is also the author and illustrator of the ongoing Amulet series.

Early life and education 
Kibuishi was born April 8, 1978, in Tokyo, Japan. He moved to the United States with his mother and brother in 1982.

Kibuishi enrolled at the University of California, Santa Barbara in 1996 in pursuit of a film studies degree. While attending UC Santa Barbara, he credits the university's newspaper, the Daily Nexus, as where his illustration career started. Though he had previously drawn for his high school's newspaper, Kibuishi has stated that "[his career] all began when I started writing comics for the Nexus. I actually went to UCSB for film. I was trying to quit drawing." He would ultimately serve as the Art Director for the Daily Nexus for three and a half years, and developed his comic Clive and Cabbage during his tenure. He graduated from UC Santa Barbara in 2000 with a B.A. in film studies.

Career 
Kibuishi started drawing at age five. He has stated that it was "the sadness that came from no longer having cool robot TV shows like Ultraman around once we came to the States that triggered a lot of my early drawings and projects." He has also noted Garfield and the magazines Mad Magazine, and CARtoons as catalysts for his love of comic books in particular.

After he graduated from UC Santa Barbara, Kibuishi worked as an animator for Shadedbox Animations for two years. He decided to leave animation to focus on comics, where he could spend more time writing. He started producing the monthly comic Copper at his website which ran for seven years, ending in 2009.

Flight 
Flight was conceived by Kibuishi as an anthology with contributions coming from friends. The project was promoted at the Alternative Press Expo, where it attracted the attention of Erik Larsen, then-new publisher of Image Comics. This caused the project to explode, attracting talent from all over the industry. Image published the first volume in 2004 and the anthology series concluded with the eighth volume in 2011.

Explorer 
Following the conclusion of Flight, the Explorer series was Kibuishi's anthology for children using many of the same contributors to Flight. Seen as a successor series, Explorer covered three books and concluded with Explorer: The Hidden Doors.

Amulet 
Kibuishi is the creator of Amulet, a series of graphic novels which debuted in 2008 with The Stonekeeper. Scholastic won the rights to publish the series after they were victorious in a hotly contested auction. In addition to The Stonekeeper, other titles in the series include The Stonekeeper's Curse, The Cloud Searchers, The Last Council, Prince of the Elves, Escape From Lucien, Firelight, and Supernova. The series currently has eight books, with a ninth book anticipated to conclude the series based on Kibuishi’s prior announcements.

Other projects 
While editing Flight Volume 1, Kibuishi created the 4-issue steampunk graphic novel Daisy Kutter: The Last Train, published by Viper Comics.

Through his relationship with Scholastic, Kibuishi was asked to illustrate the covers for the Harry Potter novels for inclusion in the 15th anniversary edition box set.

He also illustrated the story "?" for the short story collection Machine of Death.

Honors and awards 
Kibuishi's Flight Volume 2 was nominated for the 2006 Eisner Award for Best Anthology. Daisy Kutter: The Last Train was named as one of the 2006 Best Books for Young Adults by the Young Adult Library Services Association.

His series Amulet has spent numerous weeks on The New York Times' Best Seller list.

Personal life 
Kibuishi is married to fellow illustrator and collaborator Amy Kim Ganter. He has two children, Juni and Sophie. He resides in Bellevue, Washington. He suffered a life-threatening case of bacterial meningitis which resulted in a hospital stay for weeks and being induced into a coma for treatment.

References

External links 

 
 Scholastic biography

1978 births
Living people
American illustrators
American artists of Japanese descent
Comic book editors
American comics artists
American webcomic creators
University of California, Santa Barbara alumni
People from Tokyo
People from Alhambra, California
Web Cartoonists' Choice Award winners
Japanese emigrants to the United States